Don Quixote (translit. Don Kikhot) is a 1957 Soviet drama film directed by Grigori Kozintsev. It is based on Evgeny Schwartz's stage adaptation of Miguel de Cervantes's novel of the same name. It was entered into the 1957 Cannes Film Festival.

The film was exhibited in the mid-1960s by Australian University film clubs receiving the productions of Sovexportfilm. It was the first film version of Don Quixote to be filmed in both widescreen and color.

Cast
 Nikolay Cherkasov as Don Quixote de la Mancha / Alonso Quixano
 Yuri Tolubeyev as Sancho Panza
 Serafima Birman as The Housekeeper
 Lyudmila Kasyanova as Aldonsa
 Svetlana Grigoryeva as The Niece
 Vasily Maksimov as The Priest
 Viktor Kolpakov as The Barber
 Tamilla Agamirova as Lady Altisidora
 Georgy Vitsin as Sanson Carrasco
 Bruno Freindlich as The Duke
 Lidiya Vertinskaya as The Duchess
 Galina Volchek as Maritornes

References

External links

1957 films
1950s historical drama films
Soviet historical drama films
1950s Russian-language films
Films based on Don Quixote
Films based on works by Evgeny Shvarts
Films directed by Grigori Kozintsev
Films set in Spain
Films set in the 1600s